Prince Khalifa Bin Salman Island is an artificial island in the archipelago of Bahrain.

History
It is named after Prince Khalifa Bin Salman.
The island was built by Nass group.

Geography
The artificial island is roughly rectangle in shape, and includes the Prince Khalifa Bin Salman Park and the Sheikh Khalifa Bin Salman Bridge.

Administration
The island belongs to Muharraq Governorate .

Transportation
The island is in the center of the Sheikh Khalifa Bin Salman Bridge., which connects Hidd to Juffair.

Tourism
The island is one of Bahrain's top tourist attractions because of Hidd Waterpark located on the island.

Image gallery

References 

Islands of Bahrain
Artificial islands of Bahrain
Islands of the Persian Gulf